Thom Keyes (1949–1995) was a writer, of science fiction and screenplays. He is mainly remembered as the writer of the Space: 1999 episode "The Taybor".

He was born in the US, but raised in Britain. He married Regina von Kesslann. He wrote stories for Science Fantasy and New Worlds magazines. His first novel was All Night Stand, followed by Second Coming and The Battle of Disneyland.

External links

English science fiction writers
1949 births
1995 deaths
20th-century English novelists
American emigrants to England